Květoslava Peschke (née Hrdličková; born 9 July 1975) is a Czech retired professional tennis player who was ranked world No. 1 in doubles.

She reached a career-high singles ranking of No. 26 in November 2005, winning one WTA singles title in Makarska in 1998, but achieved most of her success in doubles. Peschke claimed her first Grand Slam title at the 2011 Wimbledon Championships, partnering Katarina Srebotnik. The pair also jointly attained the world No. 1 ranking in doubles for the next ten weeks, and were the 2011 WTA Doubles Team of the Year, having previously reached the final at the 2010 French Open. In mixed doubles, she finished runner-up at the US Open in 2006, 2010, and 2012, alongside Martin Damm, Aisam-ul-Haq Qureshi and Marcin Matkowski respectively.

Peschke won 36 doubles titles on the WTA Tour between 1998 and 2021, including seven at WTA 1000 level, and also finished runner-up at the WTA Finals on three occasions. Later in her career, she became well-known for her longevity, returning to the Wimbledon doubles final in 2018 with Nicole Melichar, at the age of 43, and winning her final tour-level title at the 2021 Chicago Classic aged 46.

Peschke married her coach, Torsten Peschke, on 5 May 2003 in Berlin.

Career

2005–2010
In her first event of the season, she reached the quarterfinals of the Tier-V event in Hobart. At Wimbledon, she reached the fourth round, defeating Vera Zvonareva and Conchita Martínez, a former winner. She reached her first semifinal of the year at the Tier-II-event in Linz, defeating Elena Dementieva, Zvonareva and Ai Sugiyama. She also reached a quarterfinal at another Tier-II-event, in Philadelphia, before losing to Dementieva in three sets.

Peschke's doubles career has been more successful, including her top-10 debut in the doubles ranking in September 2006. In 2005, she won two WTA doubles titles in Paris (Tier II) and in Linz (Tier II) and reached the finals of four WTA Tour doubles events. In 2006, she won WTA doubles titles, defending her 2005 title at Paris and winning in Dubai (Tier II). Her main successes in doubles came at three of the four grand slams, reaching the quarterfinals of the French Open, the quarterfinals of Wimbledon, and the semifinals of the US Open. Her partner in each event was Francesca Schiavone. She also lost in the 2006 US Open mixed doubles final with Martin Damm to Bob Bryan and Martina Navratilova.

At the 2007 US Open, Peschke and Rennae Stubbs reached the doubles semifinals, before losing to Nathalie Dechy and Dinara Safina. The Peschke-Stubbs team won their first title in Stuttgart. In the final, the team defeated Chan Yung-jan and Safina in three sets. Other titles included Los Angeles and the 2007 Zurich Open.

Peschke partnered with Aisam-ul-Haq Qureshi of Pakistan to reach the final of the mixed doubles at the US Open. In the final, Peschke and Qureshi lost to Bob Bryan and Liezel Huber, in straight sets.

2011–2012
Peschke and Slovenia's Katarina Srebotnik were one of the most victorious doubles teams in 2011. The pair won in Auckland, Doha, Carlsbad, Eastbourne and Beijing. In 2011, they also won their first Grand Slam title at Wimbledon, defeating Sabine Lisicki and Samantha Stosur in the final.

Peschke won two doubles titles in 2012, in Sydney with Srebotnik, and in Linz with Anna-Lena Grönefeld.

2022: Retirement 
Peschke announced her retirement on 8 April 2022, playing her final match at the Charleston Open, putting an end to career that span almost 30 years. At age 46 she was the oldest active player in the WTA rankings. She planned to retire officially at 2022 Wimbledon.

World TeamTennis
Peschke has played eight seasons with World TeamTennis starting in 2008 when she debuted in the league with the Kansas City Explorers. She stayed with the Explorers for another three years (2008-2011), then played a season with the New York Sportimes in 2013, the San Diego Aviators in 2014, the Philadelphia Freedoms in 2017, and the Washington Kastles in 2019.

Career statistics

Grand Slam tournament finals

Doubles: 3 (1 title, 2 runner-ups)

Mixed doubles: 3 (3 runner-ups)

Grand Slam performance timelines

Singles

Doubles

Mixed doubles

Notes
 At the 2008 Australian Open, Peschke and Martin Damm withdrew before their quarterfinal match, this is not counted as a loss.
At the 2008 Wimbledon Championships, Peschke and Pavel Vízner received a third-round walkover, this is not counted as a win.
At the 2013 Australian Open, Peschke and Marcin Matkowski received a second-round walkover, this is not counted as a win.
At the 2021 Wimbledon Championships, Peschke and Kevin Krawietz received second and third-round walkovers, these are not counted as wins.

References

External links

 
 
 

1975 births
Living people
Czech female tennis players
People from Bílovec
Tennis players from Prague
Tennis players at the 2000 Summer Olympics
Wimbledon champions
Grand Slam (tennis) champions in women's doubles
Olympic tennis players of the Czech Republic
WTA number 1 ranked doubles tennis players
ITF World Champions